Catherine ("Cathy") Tanvier (born 28 May 1965) is a former tennis player from France.

She peaked at number 20 in 1984, and won one singles and nine doubles titles on the WTA Tour.

Career
In 1982, Tanvier became Wimbledon girls' singles champion after defeating first-seeded Helena Suková in the final in straight sets.

Tanvier won one singles title on the WTA Tour, at the 1983 Freiburg Open clay court tournament, defeating Laura Arraya in the final in straight sets.

At the Wimbledon Championships she reached the fourth round in the singles event in 1985, which she lost to eight-seeded Zina Garrison. Reaching the fourth round was also her best singles result at the Australian Open (1989, 1990, 1991) and French Open (1983, 1988). Her best career result at a Grand Slam tournament was reaching the semifinal of the 1983 French Open women's doubles event with Ivanna Madruga.

Tanvier published two biographies; in 2007 she wrote Déclassée – de Roland-Garros au RMI, and in 2013 published Détraquements, de la colère à la torpeur.

In 2010, she made her debut as an actress in Jean-Luc Godard's Film Socialisme.

She now lives in Nice, France.

WTA career finals

Singles: 5 (1 title, 4 runner-ups)

Doubles: 21 (9–12)

ITF finals

Singles (3–1)

Doubles (11–6)

Notes

References

External links
 
 
 

1965 births
French female tennis players
Hopman Cup competitors
Living people
Olympic tennis players of France
Tennis players at the 1984 Summer Olympics
Wimbledon junior champions
Grand Slam (tennis) champions in girls' singles
Sportspeople from Toulouse
French women writers